Bellignat is a commune in the Ain department in eastern France. Bellignat station has rail connections to Bourg-en-Bresse and Oyonnax.

Population

See also
Communes of the Ain department

References

External links

Gazetteer Entry

Communes of Ain
Ain communes articles needing translation from French Wikipedia